{{DISPLAYTITLE:C21H23NO}}
The molecular formula C21H23NO (molar mass: 305.41 g/mol, exact mass: 305.1780 u) may refer to:

 Dapoxetine
 Indapyrophenidone
 JWH-167 (1-pentyl-3-(phenylacetyl)indole)

Molecular formulas